Council Directive 93/98/EEC of 29 October 1993 harmonising the term of protection of copyright and certain related rights is a European Union directive in the field of EU copyright law, made under the internal market provisions of the Treaty of Rome. It was replaced by the 2006 Copyright Term Directive (2006/116/EC).

Duration of protection 
The principal goal was to ensure that there was a single duration for copyright and related rights across the entire European Union. The chosen term for a work was 70 years from the death of the author (post mortem auctoris, pma) for authors' rights regardless of when the work was first lawfully published (Art. 1), longer than the 50-year post mortem auctoris term required by the Berne Convention for the Protection of Literary and Artistic Works (Art. 7.1 Berne Convention). In the case that the author is anonymous or pseudonymous the term for a work is 70 years from the date of first lawful publication. The directive notes that the original goal of the Berne Convention was to protect works for two generations after the death of the author, and that fifty years was no longer sufficient for this purpose (para. 5 of the preamble). It is often stated that 70 years pma was the longest copyright term of any Member State at the time: this is not strictly correct, and is not quoted as the reason for the choice in the directive. Where a Member State protected a work for a longer period at the time the directive came into force, the copyright term is not reduced [Art. 10(1)], but other Member States will not respect the longer period.

The duration of protection of related rights (those of performers, phonogram and film producers and broadcasting organisations) was set at fifty years with the following rules for calculating the starting date (Art. 3). This fifty-year period was in reflexion of the negotiating position of the European Community at the negotiations which led to the Marrakech Agreements, including the Agreement on Trade-Related Aspects of Intellectual Property Rights (TRIPS).

Copyright restoration 
The new copyright terms applied also to works which were already in existence when it came into force, as was held by the European Court of Justice in the Butterfly case, even if they had previously entered the public domain. Strictly, they applied to works which were protected in at least one Member State on 1 July 1995, although most Member States chose to apply them to all works which would qualify on the basis of the protection terms, regardless of protection elsewhere: this approach is much simpler for national courts to apply, as they do not have to consider foreign laws.

The effect of the approach was shown by the judgment of the European Court of Justice in the Puccini case, which covered facts arising before the directive entered force. The State of Hesse in Germany had staged the opera La Bohème by Puccini during the 1993/94 season at the Hessische Staatstheater Wiesbaden without the permission of the copyright holder. The opera was first published in Italy and Puccini died on 29 November 1924. At the time, Italy applied a copyright period of 56 years pma, so Italian protection had expired at the end of 1980: Germany, however, applied a 70 years pma period to works of German authors and the "rule of the shorter term" (Art. 7.8 Berne Convention) to foreign works. The Court ruled that the application of the rule of the shorter term between Member States was a breach of the principle of non-discrimination enshrined in Article 12 of the Treaty instituting the European Community: hence the work should have been protected in Germany even if it was no longer protected in Italy. Such cases should no longer arise with the implementation of the directive.

Films and photographs 
The directive also harmonises the copyright treatment of films ("cinematographic and other audiovisual works") and photographs throughout the European Union. Films are protected for 70 years from the death of the last of the following people to die [Art. 2(2)]: the principal director, the author of the screenplay, the author of the dialogue and the composer of music specifically created for use in the cinematographic or audiovisual work. This applies regardless of the provisions of national law regarding the authorship of the film, ensuring a common duration of copyright between Member States. The principal director of the film is always considered as an author of the film, although national legislations may provide for other co-authors [Art. 2(1)].

Before the directive, different Member States had applied widely different criteria of originality and creativity to the copyright protection of photographs. These were harmonised by article 6, which states that the only permissible criterion for full protection (70 years pma) is that the photograph is "original in the sense that [it is] the author's own intellectual creation". Member States may protect photographs which do not meet this criterion by sui generis related rights.

Previously unpublished works 
The directive accords a publication right to the publisher of a public domain work which was previously unpublished, for 25 years after the date of publication (Art. 4). The work must have been "legally published". In some countries (e.g. France), authors and their heirs have a perpetual right to authorise (or not) the publication of a work and, in these cases, publication must be with the consent of the holders of the moral rights in the work.

Other provisions 
As is normal in the field of copyright law, all periods of protection run until the end of the calendar year in which they would otherwise expire (Art. 8). Member states may protect "critical and scientific publications of works which have come into the public domain" for a maximum of thirty years (Art. 5). The protection of moral rights is left to national legislation (Art. 9).

Implementation

See also 
Copyright law of the European Union
Grandfather clause
Directive on the term of protection of copyright and certain related rights

Citations and footnotes

External links 
Council Directive 93/98/EEC of 29 October 1993 harmonizing the term of protection of copyright and certain related rights replaced by directive 2006/116/EC
Adoption process of directive 93/98/EEC
Directive 2006/116/EC of the European Parliament and of the Council of 12 December 2006 on the term of protection of copyright and certain related rights (codified version) is the consolidated version of 93/98/EC with amendments that is in force since 2007.
Adoption process of directive 2006/116/EC
Geller, P. (2000). "Zombie and Once-Dead Works: Copyright Retroactivity After the E.C. Term Directive", Entertainment and Sports Lawyer, 18(2), pp. 7ff (ABA Forum on Entertainment Industries, 2000).

Copyright law of the European Union
European Union directives
European Union
1993 in law
1993 in the European Union